Alvaro Paseyro (born 27 November 1968) is a Uruguayan judoka. He competed in the men's half-middleweight event at the 2000 Summer Olympics.

References

1968 births
Living people
Uruguayan male judoka
Olympic judoka of Uruguay
Judoka at the 2000 Summer Olympics
Place of birth missing (living people)
South American Games silver medalists for Uruguay
South American Games medalists in judo
Competitors at the 2002 South American Games